In June 1966, the Army Vietnam Combat Artists Program was established as part of the United States Army Art Program, utilizing teams of soldier-artists to make pictorial records of U.S. Army activities in the course of the Vietnam War for the annals of military history. The concept of the Vietnam Combat Art Program had its roots in World War II when the U.S. Congress authorized the Army to use soldier-artists to record military operations in 1944.

During the Vietnam Era, the U.S. Army Chief of Military History asked Marian McNaughton, then Curator for the Army Art Collection, to develop a plan for a Vietnam soldier art program. The result was the creation in 1966 of the U. S. Army Vietnam Combat Art Program under the direction of the Office of Chief of Military History and McNaughton's office. Her plan included involving the U.S. Army Arts and Crafts Program, then headed by Eugenia Nowlin. McNaughton's office relied on Nowlin and her cadre of local Army Arts and Crafts directors to solicit applications from soldiers, which were forwarded to McNaughton's office at the U.S. Army Center of Military History, where selection and team assignments were made. The U.S. Army provided logistics support as the teams of artists were sent to Vietnam and then to Hawaii.

Artists interested in joining the program were asked to submit applications through the Army Arts and Crafts Program facilities nearest their unit.   Applications were to contain samples of drawings, photographs of paintings and a resume. Selections were made by a committee composed of designated representatives from the Office, Chief of Military History and the Adjutant General's Office. Supervised by Army Art Curator Marian McNaughton. The program was the joint responsibility of the Office, Chief of Military History, and the Adjutant General's Office with support from the Office, Chief of information.

History

Nine Combat Artist Teams (CATs) operated in Vietnam. Typically, each team consisted of five soldier artists who spent 60 days of temporary duty (TDY) in Vietnam gathering information and making preliminary sketches of U.S. Army related activities. The teams then transferred to Hawaii for an additional 75 days to finish their work. Artists were given artistic freedom and encouraged to depict subjects in their own individual styles. Art created by soldier artists became a part of the U.S. Army Art Collection maintained by the U.S. Army Center of Military History (CMH), Washington, D.C.

On 17 March 1969, due to the widespread interest shown by soldier artists and the impact of their work throughout the Army, the official name was changed from the VIETNAM COMBAT ART PROGRAM to the ARMY ARTIST PROGRAM. Coverage was expanded to include portraying the U.S. Army worldwide.

U.S. Army soldier artist participants

List of U.S. Army Vietnam Combat Artist Team (CAT) members and supervisors from 15 August 1966 – 14 January 1970. (Cities listed reflect information on original applications which are currently in archives of U.S. Army Center of Military History).

 CAT I, 15 Aug - 15 Dec 1966, Roger A. Blum (Stillwell, KS), Robert C. Knight (Newark, NJ), Ronald E. Pepin (East Hartford, CT), Paul Rickert (Philadelphia, PA), Felix R. Sanchez (Fort Madison, IA), John O. Wehrle (Dallas, TX), and supervisor, Frank M. Sherman.
 CAT II, 15 Oct 1966 – 15 Feb 1967, Augustine G. Acuna (Monterey, CA), Alexander A. Bogdanovich (Chicago, IL), Theodore E. Drendel (Naperville, IL), David M. Lavender (Houston, TX), Gary W. Porter (El Cajon, CA), and supervisor, Carolyn M. O'Brien.
 CAT III, 16 Feb - 17 June 1967, Michael R. Crook (Sierra Madre, CA), Dennis O. McGee (Castro Valley, CA), Robert T. Myers (White Sands Missile Range, NM), Kenneth J. Scowcroft (Manassas, VA), Stephen H. Sheldon (Los Angeles, CA), and supervisor, C. Bruce Smyser.
 CAT IV, 15 Aug - 31 Dec 1967, Samuel E. Alexander (Philadelphia, MS), Daniel T. Lopez (Fresno, CA), Burdell Moody (Mesa, AZ), James R. Pollock (Pollock, SD), Ronald A. Wilson (Lakewood, CA), and technical supervisor, Frank M. Thomas.
 CAT V, 1 Nov 1967 – 15 March 1968, Warren W. Buchanan (Kansas City, MO), Philip V. Garner (Dearborn, MI), Phillip W. Jones (Greensboro, NC), Don R. Schol (Denton, TX), John R. Strong (Kanehoe, HI), and technical supervisor, Frank M. Thomas.
 CAT VI, 1 Feb - 15 June 1968, Robert T. Coleman (Grand Rapids, MI), David N. Fairrington (Oakland, CA), John D. Kurtz IV (Wilmington, DE), Kenneth T. McDaniel (Paris, TN), Michael P. Pala (Bridgeport, CT).
 CAT VII, 15 Aug - 31 Dec 1968, Brian H. Clark (Huntington, NY), William E. Flaherty Jr. (Louisville, KY), William C. Harrington (Terre Haute, IN), Barry W. Johnston (Huntsville, AL), Stephen H. Randall (Des Moines, IA), and supervisor, Fitzallen N. Yow.
 CAT VIII, 1 Feb - 15 June 1969, Edward J. Bowen (Carona Del Mar, CA), James R. Drake (Colorado Springs, CO), Roman Rakowsky (Cleveland, OH), Victory V. Reynolds (Idaho Falls, ID), Thomas B. Schubert (Chicago, IL), and supervisor, Fred B. Engel.
 CAT IX, 1 Sept 1969 - 14 Jan 1970, David E. Graves (Lawrence, KS), James S. Hardy (Coronado, CA), William R. Hoettels (San Antonio, TX), Bruce N. Rigby (Dekalb, IL), Craig L. Stewart (Laurel, MD), and supervisor, Edward C. Williams.

James Pollock, who in 1967 served as a soldier artist on U. S. Army Vietnam Combat Artist Team IV (CAT IV), chronicled his experience in an essay entitled "US Army Soldier-Artists in Vietnam" for "War, Literature & the Arts: An International Journal of the Humanities" published by the department of English and Fine Arts, United States Air Force Academy. In the essay Pollock wrote: "The idea of rotating teams of young soldier-artists from a variety of backgrounds and experiences through Vietnam was innovative. Soldier-artists were encouraged to freely express and interpret their individual experience in their own distinct styles. The artists responded enthusiastically to their artistic , and the resulting products were wide-ranging and comprehensive. Styles and media used were as diverse as the artists themselves, some chose detailed literal images while others preferred expressive almost abstract explosions striving to replicate the horrors of war".

Army artists after Vietnam

During the Vietnam War the army art program also used civilian artists. While the last team of soldier artists in Vietnam was Soldier Art Team 9 (CAT IX) the Army's interest in using artists to depict army activities continued. The 1991 book "Portrait of an Army", published by U. S. Army Center of Military History and edited by General Gordon R. Sullivan and Marylou Gjernes, states "Following the Vietnam War, the Army continued to use both soldier and civilian artists. They have covered such peacetime activities as summer training for Reserve Officers' Training Corps (ROTC) West Point cadets, Army National Guard annual training, and tank gunnery training in Europe. The Army Art Collection has also acquired depictions of the Army's operations in Panama and Operations DESERT SHIELD and DESERT STORM."

In 2003, former Vietnam soldier-artist James Pollock gave a presentation entitled "U. S. Army Vietnam Combat Art Program" about Vietnam Era soldier artists at Mary Pickford Theater, U. S. Library of Congress at which he said: "On January 14, 1970, the members of Vietnam Combat Art Team IX (CAT IX), the last U.S. Army art team to set foot in Vietnam, disbanded. Like members of eight other Army soldier-artist teams before them, they left their sketchbooks and paintings of war-torn Vietnam behind and quietly returned to their respective military units scattered throughout the world or were re-assigned. Talent and chance had brought 46 young soldiers together for a common purpose: To be artists day in and day out for 120 days and to translate their personal Vietnam experiences as soldiers into art. All of the artists were exposed to the inherent dangers of being in a war zone. While visiting units in the fields of Vietnam, they encountered difficult conditions and some had to deal with life-threatening incidents. None were wounded or killed. The post-Vietnam Era destiny of these soldier artists varied as they went on to establish and nurture families and careers. Some continued successfully as artists, some became art teachers, some laid down their paint brushes and found careers outside the field of art. Some have died, and the whereabouts of others is unknown".

Public showings
From September 2010 to March 2011, the National Constitution Center in Philadelphia, PA hosted an exhibit entitled "Art of the American Soldier" featuring more than 300 works from the army art collection, one of the first times that the Army Art from the Army Art Program has been put on display en masse.

In June 2015, South Dakota Public Broadcasting interviewed combat artist James Pollock about his experiences in the Vietnam Combat Art Program.

In September 2017, South Dakota Public Broadcasting produced a video about the Vietnam Combat Artists Program entitled "The Art of War" as part of their SD Vietnam Stories project produced to accompany the broadcast of Ken Burns' "The Vietnam War" series.

See also
United States Army Art Program
United States Air Force Art Program
American official war artists

Art Gallery (All Images Courtesy of the National Museum of the U.S. Army)

CAT I 15 August to 15 December 1966

CAT II 15 October 1966 to 15 February 1967

CAT III 16 February 1967 to 17 June 1967

CAT IV 15 August to 31 December 1967

CAT V 1 November 1967 to 15 March 1968

CAT VI 1 February 1968 to 15 June 1968

CAT VII 15 August 1968 to 31 December 1968

CAT VIII 1 February 1969 to 15 June 1969

CAT IX 1 September 1969 to 14 January 1970

References

External links
Artwork from the Art Program at the United States Army Center of Military History webpage
Humanities Magazine September/October 2011: Volume 32, Number 5
About light and dark in peace and war and a piece of Vietnam by Lance Nixon, Capital Journal (South Dakota), 17 January 2014.
Drawing fire by Lance Nixon, Capital Journal  (South Dakota), 23 January 2014.
A photograph of a war is different from a painting “that’s not rocket science” by Dave Askins, Capital Journal  (South Dakota), 20 April 2018.
Combat artists share ware experiences by Kerri Lawrence, National Archives News, 9 April 2018 
National Aarchives Facebook Combat Art Panel 
US Army Soldier-Artists in Vietnam (CAT IV, 15 August to 31 December, 1967) by James Pollock, War, Literature & the Arts: An International Journal of the Humanities, free downloadable PDF South Dakota State University Open PRAIRIE repository/2009 Volume 21 
SDPB Radio Interview MIDDAY Karl Gehrke interviews James Pollock, 10 June 2015.

 
United States Army projects
Works about Vietnam
Vietnam War
War art
Arts organizations based in the United States